Ross McNicol is an artist, who lives and works in London.

The Wallis Gallery

In 2007, with Ed Fornieles and Vanessa Carlos, Ross McNicol started The Wallis Gallery in Hackney Wick, London, where together they organised exhibitions and a performance night, Making Mistakes.

External links
 Other Criteria
 The Guardian, "Wallis Dies"

Notes and references

1979 births
Living people
English contemporary artists
Alumni of King's College London
Photographers from London